is a railway station in the city of Toyota, Aichi Prefecture, Japan, operated by the third sector Aichi Loop Railway Company.

Lines

Station layout
The station has one side platform built on an embankment. The station building has automated ticket machines, TOICA automated turnstiles and is staffed.

Adjacent stations

Station history
Kaizu Station was opened on March 1, 1985.

Passenger statistics
In fiscal 2017, the station was used by an average of 1062 passengers daily.

Surrounding area
 Chukyo University Toyota campus

See also
 List of railway stations in Japan

References

External links

Official home page 

Railway stations in Japan opened in 1985
Railway stations in Aichi Prefecture
Toyota, Aichi